Tomáš Wiesner (born 17 July 1997) is a Czech football player. He plays for Sparta Prague.

International career
He made his debut for the Czech Republic national football team on 5 September 2021 in a World Cup qualifier against Belgium, a 0–3 away loss. He substituted Adam Hložek in the 77th minute.

References

External links
 
 

1997 births
Footballers from Prague
Living people
Czech footballers
Czech Republic youth international footballers
Czech Republic under-21 international footballers
Czech Republic international footballers
Association football defenders
AC Sparta Prague players
FC Sellier & Bellot Vlašim players
FC Slovan Liberec players
FK Mladá Boleslav players
Czech National Football League players
Czech First League players
Czech people of German descent